Damon is a surname. Notable people with the surname include:

Cathryn Damon (1930–1987), American television, film and stage actress
Fannie B. Damon (1857-1939), American writer, magazine editor
Gabriel Damon (born 1976), American film actor
Johnny Damon (born 1973), American Major League baseball player
Liz Damon, lead singer of Liz Damon's Orient Express
Mark Damon (born 1933), American film actor and producer
Matt Damon (born 1970), American film actor and screenwriter
Robert Damon (1814–1889), English conchologist and geologist
S. Foster Damon (1893–1971), American academic and poet
William Damon (born 1944), psychologist and educator
William Damon, or William Daman (died 1591), musician in England